Darryl Wilson (born May 29, 1974) is an American former basketball player. He played college basketball for Mississippi State before going on to play several seasons professionally, including in the Lega Basket Serie A and the Israeli Basketball Premier League.

Playing career

High school career
Wilson played high school basketball for South Lamar High School in Kennedy, Alabama, where he averaged 37.8 points a game as a senior.

College career
After graduating from South Lamar, Wilson joined the Mississippi State Bulldogs in 1992 but had to sit out his first season to meet NCAA academic eligibility requirements. In 1996 he was an All-SEC guard during each of his three seasons with the Bulldogs, including a first team selection in 1996. He twice made the National Association of Basketball Coaches All-District team. During his senior year, the team made it all the way to the NCAA Final Four.

Professional career
Wilson started his professional career with the Florida Sharks who drafted him with the 11th pick overall in the 1996 USBL draft. He was released by the Sharks in end of May the same year.

In 1997, Wilson signed with Grindavík of the Icelandic Úrvalsdeild karla. During the second game of the regular season, he scored a season high 53 points. He helped the team win the Icelandic Basketball Cup after beating KFÍ in front of a record crowd in Laugardalshöll in the Cup finals, scoring 37 points. He was however fired from the team with 4 games left of the regular season due to repetitive disciplinary issues. Despite this, he led the league in scoring, avering 33.3 points per game.

Wilson retired from playing in 2009.

References

External links 
Profile at proballers.com
Profile at Eurobasket.com
Úrvalsdeild statistics at Icelandic Basketball Association
College statistics at Sports Reference

1974 births
Living people
American expatriate basketball people in Iceland
American expatriate basketball people in Israel
American expatriate basketball people in Italy
American expatriate basketball people in Turkey
American men's basketball players
Basketball players from Alabama
Basket Livorno players
Guards (basketball)
Grindavík men's basketball players
Ironi Ramat Gan players
Lega Basket Serie A players
Maccabi Rishon LeZion basketball players
Mersin Büyükşehir Belediyesi S.K. players
Mississippi State Bulldogs men's basketball players
People from Lamar County, Alabama
Scafati Basket players
Úrvalsdeild karla (basketball) players